Joan Pennington (born c. 1960) is an American former competition swimmer who won one silver and two gold medals at the 1978 World Aquatics Championships.  She qualified for the 1980 Summer Olympics, but could not participate because of the United States-led boycott of the Moscow Olympics.

Pennington attended the University of Texas, and swam for the Texas Longhorns swimming and diving team in Association for Intercollegiate Athletics for Women (AIAW) and National Collegiate Athletic Association (NCAA) competition.  During her college swimming career she won eight AIAW and NCAA championships and received 28 All-American honors.  She was the recipient of the Honda Sports Award for Swimming and Diving, recognizing her as the outstanding college female swimmer of 1978–79.

She had a two-year break from swimming from 1980 to 1982 and finally retired in 1984.  She received her master's degree in health promotion and exercise science from Vanderbilt University, and a doctorate degree in preventive health care at the School of Public Health, Loma Linda University in California.

See also
 List of University of Texas at Austin alumni
 List of Vanderbilt University people
 List of World Aquatics Championships medalists in swimming (women)

References

1960 births
Living people
American female backstroke swimmers
American female butterfly swimmers
American female medley swimmers
People from Franklin, Tennessee
Swimmers at the 1983 Pan American Games
Texas Longhorns women's swimmers
Vanderbilt University alumni
World Aquatics Championships medalists in swimming
Pan American Games silver medalists for the United States
Pan American Games medalists in swimming
Medalists at the 1983 Pan American Games
20th-century American women